"Surrender" is a song by American rock band Godsmack. It marks the first single from their eighth and final studio album Lighting Up the Sky and their first new music in four years since the release of their seventh studio album When Legends Rise in 2018.

Lyrical theme 
In an exclusive comment to Audacy, frontman Sully Erna described the song as "very cut and dry", and revealed that it's about waving the white flag in a relationship:

Liz Scarlett of Louder Sound magazine described the lyrics as both "brooding" and "contemplative".

Release 
On September 22, 2022, the band released a 12-second teaser for "Surrender". The single made its official world premiere on September 28.

Music video
The music video for "Surrender" was released on November 18, 2022. The clip alternates between live footage of the band performing the song, behind the scene footage, and heartfelt interactions they had with fans throughout the years.

Reception

Critical 
Initial reviews of the single have been positive. Greg Kennelty of Metal Injection described the song as having "this very specific early 2000s radio vibe to it" but noted that "I don't mean it in a bad way either. Joe DiVita of Loudwire praised the song as both "catchy" and "punchy" and commended the band for their hit-writing ability 25 years into their career.

Commercial 
Upon its release, "Surrender" entered multiple charts, including the Billboard Mainstream Rock. Like the band's previous four singles from the When Legends Rise, "Surrender" peaked at number one, giving Godsmack their first number one single off Lighting Up the Sky, and their twelfth number one single overall.

Personnel 
Godsmack
 Sully Erna – vocals, rhythm guitar, producer
 Tony Rombola – lead guitar
 Robbie Merrill – bass
 Shannon Larkin – drums

Charts

References 

2022 singles
2022 songs
Godsmack songs
Songs written by Sully Erna